SS Trent was a British steamship that was built in 1899 as an ocean liner for the Royal Mail Steam Packet Company (RMSP) service between England and the Caribbean. In the First World War she was a Royal Navy depot ship. She was scrapped in 1922.

This was the last of three RMSP ships that were named after the English River Trent. RMSP's first Trent was built in 1841 and scrapped in 1867. The second was built as Vasco da Gama in 1873, renamed Trent in 1878 and scrapped in 1897.

Building
In 1899 Robert Napier and Sons in Govan built a pair of sister ships for RMSP. Tagus was launched on 27 June and completed that October. Trent was launched on 19 September 1899 and completed in January 1900. Trent was built as yard number 467.

Trent had a single screw, driven by a three-cylinder triple expansion engine.

Tagus and Trent had a straight stem, counter stern and twin funnels. The two ships looked like RMSP's Nile and Danube of 1893 and 1894, but were slightly smaller, and had two masts instead of Nile and Danubes three.

RMSP registered Trent at London. Her UK official number was 112664 and her code letters were RMGF.

Civilian liner

On 6 June 1909 Trent ran aground on Semedine Bank, near Cartagena, Colombia.  tried to tow her off, but without success. Trent was refloated that May.

By 1910 Trent was equipped for submarine signalling and wireless telegraphy. By 1913 her wireless call sign was UNR.

America airship crew rescue
In October 1910 Trent rescued the six-man crew of the airship America, including its owner, Walter Wellman. They had been trying to make the first transatlantic crossing by air. America had left Bader Field, New Jersey on 15 October. Changes in wind direction had slowed the airship's progress and blown it off-course, and technical problems had caused it to lose height. At 0507 hrs on the morning of 18 October, Americas crew sighted Trent, which was also off her usual course. Trents usual route had been changed to make a one-off call at Antilla, Cuba. She left Antilla on 14 October, making her two days late to reach her next call at Bermuda. The change in both her course and her schedule was what led Trent to be in the right position at the right time to sight and rescue Americas crew.

America contacted Trent by signal lamp, and requested assistance. The airship crew signalled to the steamship by Morse code, and also by displaying a signal of two red lights one below the other, meaning that America was not under control. After establishing contact by signal lamp, America and Trent communicated almost entirely by wireless telegraph. Trents Master, Captain CE Down, RNR, reported that "The wireless played a wonderful part in the rescue".

Americas crew lowered a line for Trents crew to catch, but gusty conditions repeatedly prevented this. Eventually Trents crew succeeded in catching the line and making it fast to the steamship, but another gust broke it and America was blown away.

The airship crew then reduced Americas altitude and launched her lifeboat. The airship struck the lifeboat and nearly capsized it, but the boat righted itself and the airship floated away. The airmen rowed toward Trent, whose crew lowered lines to bring them safely aboard the steamship. Their position was now about 408 miles southeast of Sandy Hook, New Jersey.

Naval depot ship

On 6 March 1915 the Admiralty requisitioned Trent to serve as a depot ship. Trent transported the monitors' crews to Malta, while the monitors themselves were towed there by tugs.

Trent later returned to home waters, and on 1 October 1917 became the depot ship for HMS Icarus, the Royal Naval Air Service base at Houton Bay, Scapa Flow. Here she supported the Orkney Air Service's anti-submarine patrols until March 1918.

Disposal
The Admiralty returned Trent to her owners on 23 January 1919. She was scrapped at Rotterdam in February 1922.

References

Bibliography

External links

1899 ships
Auxiliary ships of the Royal Navy
Ocean liners of the United Kingdom
Ships built in Govan
Ships of the Royal Mail Steam Packet Company
Steamships of the United Kingdom
World War I auxiliary ships of the United Kingdom
World War I passenger ships of the United Kingdom